The following list includes some of the most significant awards and nominations received by pop musician Peter Gabriel as a solo artist.

Grammy Awards

American Music Awards

BT Digital Music Awards

!Ref.
|-
| 2006
| Himself
| Pioneer Award
| 
|

BMI London Awards

|-
| 2006
| "In Your Eyes"
| 3 Million Award
| 
|-
| 2007
| Himself
| Icon Award
| 
|-
| 2012
| "Sledgehammer"
| 3 Million Award
|

Billboard Music Awards

!Ref.
|-
| rowspan=12|1986
| rowspan=5|Himself
| Top Artist
| 
| rowspan=12|
|-
| Top Billboard 200 Artist
| 
|-
| Top Billboard 200 Artist - Male
| 
|-
| Top Hot 100 Artist
| 
|-
| Top Hot 100 Artist - Male
| 
|-
| rowspan=2|So
|  Top Billboard 200 Album
| 
|-
| Top Compact Disk
| 
|-
| rowspan=4|"Sledgehammer"
| Top Hot 100 Song
| 
|-
| Top Dance Club Play Single
|
|-
| Top Dance Sales Single
| 
|-
| rowspan=2|Top Rock Song
| 
|-
| "In Your Eyes"
| 
|-
| rowspan=7|1987
| rowspan=4|Himself
| Top Artist
| 
| rowspan=7|
|-
| Top Billboard 200 Artist - Male
| 
|-
| Top Hot 100 Artist - Male
| 
|-
| Top Hot 100 Artist
| 
|-
| rowspan=2|So
|  Top Billboard 200 Album
| 
|-
| Top Compact Disk
| 
|-
| "Big Time"
| Top Hot 100 Song
|

Brit Awards

CASBY Awards

!Ref.
|-
| 1986
| So
| International Album of the Year
| 
|

Classic Rock Roll of Honour Awards

!Ref.
|-
| 2012
| So (25th Anniversary Immersion Box Set)
| Best Box Set
| 
| 
|-
| rowspan=2|2016
| Growing Up Live + Still Growing Up Live & Unwrapped
| Best Archival Live Album or Video
| 
| rowspan=2|
|-
| Rock Paper Scissors Tour
| Tour of the Year
|

Danish Music Awards

!Ref.
|-
| 1993
| So
| Best International Album
| 
|

Denmark GAFFA Awards
{|class="wikitable"
|-
!Year!!Nominee/work!!Category!!Result!!Ref.
|-
| rowspan=3|1992
| Himself
| Best Foreign Solo Act
| 
| rowspan=3|
|-
| Us
| Best Foreign Album
| 
|-
| "Digging in the Dirt"
| Music Video of the Year
|

IM&MC Music Video Awards

!Ref.
|-
| 1986
| "Sledgehammer"
| Best Effects
| 
|

Ivor Novello Awards

MTV Video Music Awards

Academy Awards

Golden Globe Awards

Q Awards

Pollstar Concert Industry Awards 

|-
| 1987
| Himself
| Comeback of the Year 
| 
|-
| 1988
| Tour
| rowspan=2|Most Creative Stage Production
| 
|-
| rowspan=2|1994
| rowspan=3|Secret World Tour
| 
|-
| Major Tour of the Year 
| 
|-
| 1995
| Most Creative Stage Production
|

Top of the Pops Awards 

!Ref.
|-
| 2003
| Himself
| Singer of the Year
| 
|

British Academy of Songwriters, Composers, and Authors

Žebřík Music Awards

!Ref.
|-
| 2005
| Himself
| Best International Male
| 
|

See also
For Genesis, see Awards and nominations received by Genesis.
(All of the nominations and awards received by Genesis occurred 8+ years after Peter Gabriel had left the band.)

References

External links
 Peter Gabriel - Artist - www.grammy.com
 American Music Awards History
 Brit Awards (Peter Gabriel)
 Peter Gabriel - Awards & Nominations

Gabriel, Peter
Awards